The Simon Park Orchestra is a group which is most notable for producing the instrumental "Eye Level", the theme tune for the television series Van der Valk composed by Jan Stoeckart which spent four weeks at the number one position in the UK Singles Chart in September 1973. The song also peaked at number 13 in Australia.

Simon Park was born in March 1946 in Market Harborough, England. He studied at Worcester College, Oxford where he gained a Bachelor of Arts in music.

Later works
Following the success of "Eye Level", Columbia released two albums of the Orchestra's work, Something in the Air and Venus Fly Trap. However, neither achieved the success of "Eye Level". In 1988, Surrey House Music released two more albums, Simon Park & His Orchestra, Volume 1 and Simon Park & His Orchestra, Volume 2, which contain instrumental versions of pop hits. The Orchestra recordings were originally made for airplay on beautiful music radio stations.

Park co-wrote "Distant Hills", which was used as the theme tune to the television series Crown Court, and wrote the music for the 1972 ITV mystery quiz Whodunnit?, for Cross Country Go, a B movie made by British Movietone News in 1974, and incidental music for the wartime TV series Danger UXB. He also composed music for the De Wolfe music library, some of which was used in films such as Eskimo Nell (1975), and composed the score for the film Nutcracker (1982). Park appeared in an episode of Bargain Hunt which aired in 2017.

References

British orchestras
Easy listening musicians
People from Market Harborough